New York's 20th State Senate district is one of 63 districts in the New York State Senate. It has  been represented by Democrat Zellnor Myrie since 2019, following his victory over IDC-aligned incumbent Jesse Hamilton in the 2018 primary election.

Geography
District 20 covers two separate areas in central Brooklyn, linked together by a narrow strip of city blocks. The district includes parts of the neighborhoods of Brownsville, Crown Heights, East Flatbush, Gowanus, Park Slope, Prospect Heights, Prospect Lefferts Gardens, South Slope, and Sunset Park.

The district overlaps with New York's 7th, 8th, 9th, and 10th congressional districts, and with the 42nd, 43rd, 49th, 51st, 52nd, 55th, 56th, 57th, and 58th districts of the New York State Assembly.

Recent election results

2022

2020

2018

2016

2014

2012

Federal results in District 20

References

20